was a village located in Kitakoma District, Yamanashi Prefecture, Japan.

As of 2003, the village had an estimated population of 3,301 and a density of 54.31 persons per km². The total area was 60.78 km².

On November 1, 2004, Mukawa, along with the towns of Hakushū, Nagasaka, Sutama and Takane, and the villages of Akeno and Ōizumi (all from Kitakoma District), was merged to create the city of Hokuto.

External links
Mukawa official website of Hokuto city (in Japanese)

Dissolved municipalities of Yamanashi Prefecture
Hokuto, Yamanashi